Royal Charger (1942–1961) was a British Thoroughbred that was successful as a racehorse, but much more important as a sire.

Background
Royal Charger was a chestnut horse sired by the important stallion Nearco. His dam, Sun Princess, was a descendant of the famous broodmare Mumtaz Mahal. He was owned by Sir John Jarvis and trained by his unrelated namesake Jack Jarvis at Newmarket, Suffolk.

Racing career
Royal Charger failed to win as a two-year-old in 1944, but showed some promise when twice finishing second. As a three-year-old, he finished third in the 2000 Guineas at Newmarket on 9 May, beaten a neck and two lengths by Court Martial and Dante. Later that year, he was placed in the Duke of York Stakes and won the Challenge Stakes.

As a four-year-old, Royal Charger won the Queen Anne Stakes at Royal Ascot and the Ayr Gold Cup (carrying 133 pounds).

Stud career
Retired after his four-year-old racing season in 1946, Royal Charger was sold to the Irish National Stud for £52,000. There, he sired a number of important horses before being purchased in 1953 by American George D. Widener, Jr., who brought him to stand at his Old Kenney Farm (now Green Gates Farm) in Lexington, Kentucky. A three-quarters brother to the important sire Nasrullah, which also was brought to Kentucky from England, Royal Charger sired more than 55 stakes winners. Among his Irish progeny was Turn-To, which also was sent to the U.S., where he was the leading juvenile sire in 1958, notably through his colt First Landing. Other offspring included:

 Copenhagen,  four-time leading sire in New Zealand
 Happy Laughter, winner of the 1953 1000 Guineas
 Gilles de Retz, winner of the 1956 2000 Guineas
 Idun, 1957 U.S. Champion two-year-old filly and the 1958 U.S. Champion three-year-old filly
 Mongo, the 1963 U.S. Champion Male Turf Horse
 Royal Duchy, Phoenix Stakes, Lowther Stakes
 Royal Native, the 1959 U.S. Champion three-year-old filly, 1960 U.S. Champion Handicap Mare
 Royal Orbit, Preakness Stakes
 Royal Palm, Nunthorpe Stakes
 Royal Serenade, Nunthorpe Stakes, Hollywood Gold Cup
 Sea Charger, Irish 2000 Guineas, Irish St Leger

In addition, Royal Charger was an important broodmare sire of more than 70 stakes winners, including Crowned Prince, the 1971 Champion two-year-old colt in England; the 1969 U.S. Champion two-year-old filly, Tudor Queen; and U.S. Hall of Famer Majestic Prince.

Royal Charger died in November 1961 and was buried at Old Kenney Farm in Lexington.

Pedigree

References

1942 racehorse births
1961 racehorse deaths
Racehorses bred in the United Kingdom
Racehorses trained in the United Kingdom
Thoroughbred family 9-c
Chefs-de-Race